Tigran Vardanjan (born 26 March 1989) is a former competitive figure skater who represented Hungary. He is the 2007-2009 Hungarian national champion. Coached by his parents, Armenian-born Gurgen Vardanjan and Jeranjak Ipakjan, he trained in Budapest and occasionally in Nottingham, England. He is a student at the Budapest College of Communication and Business.

Programs

Competitive highlights

 QR = Qualifying round

References

External links

Navigation 

1989 births
Living people
Hungarian male single skaters
Figure skaters from Moscow
Russian people of Armenian descent
Hungarian people of Armenian descent